G H Raisoni Institute of Information Technology (GHRIIT) is an autonomous educational institute located in Nagpur which is affiliated to the Rashtrasant Tukdoji Maharaj Nagpur University (RTMNU). It offers Post-Graduate and Undergraduate degrees in the fields of computer and information technology and is part of the Raisoni Group of Institutions. It was established in year 2000 & It is approved by All India Council for Technical Education (AICTE).

Programs Offered 
GHRIIT offers following Postgraduate, Undergraduate programs:

 Master of Computer Application
 Master of Computer Management
 Post-Graduate Diploma in Computer Science & Application
 Bachelor of Computer Application

References

Universities and colleges in Nagpur
Science and technology in Nagpur